The Belarusian community RAZAM e.V. is a non-profit association of people from Belarus living in Germany. The association emerged as a result of the 2020–2021 Belarusian protests against the government of Alexander Lukashenko.

Creation and goals 
The Belarusian community RAZAM e.V. was officially founded on 9 August 2020, the day of the 2020 Belarusian presidential election, of which the results were considered to have been falsified according to Der Tagesspiegel. , it is the biggest group representing the approximately 26,000 Belarusians living in Germany.

The official goals stated by RAZAM e.V. include:
 representation of the interests of the Belarusian diaspora in Germany
 promotion of the Belarusian language and culture
 making Belarus visible to the German and European public
 being a strong lobby for a democratic Belarus
 providing assistance to victims of repression.

Funding 
RAZAM receives funding via donations.

Activities 
RAZAM's activities include helping victims of police violence, refugees, and victims of political repression that occurs in Belarus. Families of political prisoners in Belarus are helped by RAZAM with financial support for legal cases and moral support such as sending presents to the prisoners' children. Victims of police violence or torture are assisted by RAZAM in getting to Germany for medical treatment.

Within Germany itself, RAZAM helps Belarusian refugees find legal assistance for asylum applications and with donations for families without work permits and ineligible for governmental financial support. RAZAM has also helped Belarusian refugees in Ukraine, in cooperation with the NGO Free Belarus Center based there. During the 2022 full-scale Russian invasion of Ukraine, RAZAM supported Belarusians fleeing Ukraine including those in Poland.

After the outbreak of the full-scale invasion in February 2022, RAZAM helped to collect relief supplies for Ukraine, opened a storage room in Berlin to provide refugees with clothing and hot meals, and supported mine-clearing teams in Ukraine.

Information distribution and campaigning
RAZAM disseminates information and communicates with governments in the European Union. In 2021, regional RAZAM groups organised rallies, concerts and art exhibitions in Germany against the Lukashenko government and publicised their view of the situation in Belarus.

References

Non-profit organisations based in Germany
Belarusian diaspora in Europe
2020 establishments in Germany
Organizations established in 2020
Diaspora organisations in Germany
Belarus–Germany relations

External links